Diana E. H. Russell (6 November 1938 – 28 July 2020) was a feminist writer and activist. Born and raised in Cape Town, South Africa, she moved to England in 1957, and then to the United States in 1961. For the past 45 years she was engaged in research on sexual violence against women and girls. She wrote numerous books and articles on rape, including marital rape, femicide, incest, misogynist murders of women, and pornography. For The Secret Trauma, she was co-recipient of the 1986 C. Wright Mills Award. She was also the recipient of the 2001 Humanist Heroine Award from the American Humanist Association. She was also an organizer of the First International Tribunal on Crimes against Women, in Brussels in March 1976.

Early life
Russell was born and raised in Cape Town, South Africa, a twin and the fourth of the six children of a South African father, James Hamilton Russell, and a British mother, Kathleen Mary (née Gibson) Russell. She attended Herschel Girls' School, an Anglican boarding school for girls. After completing her Bachelor's degree in psychology from the University of Cape Town, at the age of 19, Russell left for Britain.

In Britain, she enrolled in a Post-Graduate Diploma in Social Science and Administration at the London School of Economics and Political Science. In 1961, she passed the Diploma with Distinction and also received the prize for the best student in the program. She moved to the United States, in 1963 where she had been accepted into an interdisciplinary PhD program at Harvard University. Her research focused on sociology and the study of revolution.

Russell's radical activism began with her involvement in the anti-apartheid movement in South Africa. In 1963, Russell had joined the Liberal Party of South Africa that had been founded by Alan Paton, the author of Cry the Beloved Country. While participating in a peaceful protest in Cape Town, Russell was arrested with other party members. She came to the conclusion that non-violent strategies were futile against the brutal violence and repression of the white Afrikaner police state. Thereafter, she joined the African Resistance Movement (ARM), an underground revolutionary movement fighting apartheid in South Africa. The principal strategy of the ARM was to bomb and sabotage government property, and though Russell was only a peripheral member of the ARM, she still risked a 10-year incarceration if caught. Russell's analysis of strategies and tactics for social and political change is detailed in her book, Rebellion, Revolution, and Armed Force: A Comparative Study of Fifteen Countries with Special Emphasis on Cuba and South Africa (1974).

Research and writings on rape and sexual abuse
Rape and other forms of men's sexual exploitation and abuse of women was one of the primary focuses of Russell's research and writings. In her book, The Politics of Rape (1975), Russell suggested that rape was a display of socially defined perceptions of masculinity instead of deviant social behavior. Her other books in this area are Rape in Marriage (1982), Sexual Exploitation: Rape, Child Sexual Abuse, and Workplace Harassment (1984). In 1986, Russell published The Secret Trauma: Incest in the Lives of Girls and Women (1986). It was one of the first scientific research studies of incestuous sexual abuse to be published. For it she received the C.Wright Mills Award in 1986. In 1993, she edited an anthology on pornography, Making Violence Sexy: Feminist Views on Pornography. Her 1994 book, Against Pornography: The Evidence of Harm, which includes 100 pornographic photos, was a study establishing how pornography encourages men to rape and leads to increased incidents of rape.

Organizing the First International Tribunal on Crimes Against Women
Russell lobbied other feminists for two years and eventually was successful in organizing the first International Tribunal on Crimes against Women in Brussels, Belgium, in 1976. The conference which lasted for four days, in which individual women from different countries testified to their personal experiences of various forms of violence and oppressions because of their gender, was attended by 2,000 women from 40 countries. By the second day it had dissolved into disaster, as "radical activists were storming the stage one after another in an improvised free-for-fall".

Simone de Beauvoir in her introductory speech to the Tribunal said: "I salute the International Tribunal as the beginning of the radical decolonization of women." Later, Belgian feminist Nicole Van de Ven documented the event in a book, Crimes Against Women: The Proceedings of the International Tribunal (1976).

Redefining and politicizing "femicide"
In 1976 Russell redefined 'femicide', as "the killing of females by males because they are female."  At the International Tribunal on Crimes Against Women, she testified to numerous examples of lethal forms of male violence against women and girls from different cultures around the world. Russell's intention was to politicize the term, and bring attention to the misogyny driving these lethal crimes against women, which she said gender-neutral terms like murder don’t do. Russell who was puzzled about the lack of response of women's groups in the United States to the use of the term 'femicide' continued to advocate the use of 'femicide' to women's groups in the United States and around the world. She explained that in order to deal with these extreme crimes against women, it is necessary to recognize that like race based hate crimes, "Femicides are [also] lethal hate crimes", and that most killings of women by men are "extreme manifestations of male dominance and sexism."

In 1993, Russell initiated an organization called Women United Against Incest, which supports incest survivors with legal assistance against their perpetrators. Similarly, she created the first TV program in South Africa where incest survivors talk in person about their experiences.

Feminist movements in many countries in Latin America, as in Mexico, Guatemala, Costa Rica, Chile, and El Salvador among others, have adopted the use of Russell's politicized 'Femicide' and have successfully used it socially, politically and legally to address lethal violence against women in their respective countries. In 1992, she co-edited an anthology, Femicide: The Politics of Woman Killing.

Other

In 1977, Russell became an associate of the Women's Institute for Freedom of the Press (WIFP). WIFP is an American nonprofit publishing organization. The organization works to increase communication between women and connect the public with forms of women-based media.

Works

Books
 
 
  Conference proceedings.
 
 
 
 
 
 
  Front cover.

Chapters in books 
 
  Pdf. 
See also: 
"The incredible case of the Stack o' Wheat prints" by Nikki Craft pp. 327-331.
"The evidence of pain" by D. A. Clarke pp. 331–336.
"The rampage against Penthouse" by Melissa Farley pp. 339–345.
  Series editors: Mary E. Odom and Jody Clay-Warner.

References

External links
Homepage
Diana Russell on web radio, 26 June 2000

White South African anti-apartheid activists
Anti-pornography feminists
Anti-prostitution feminists
Feminist studies scholars
1938 births
2020 deaths
Radical feminists
Sexual abuse victim advocates
South African expatriates in the United Kingdom
South African expatriates in the United States
South African feminists
South African people of British descent
South African sociologists
South African women sociologists
South African women writers
South African women's rights activists
South African non-fiction writers
Harvard University alumni
Alumni of the London School of Economics
University of Cape Town alumni
Alumni of Herschel Girls' School